Dragojlo Stanojlović (born February 28, 1956) is a retired Serbian footballer and current coach.

Coaching career

On 22 August 2013, he was appointed as coach of Mochudi Centre Chiefs. Due to bad performance by Mochudi Centre Chiefs team he was suspended for six months and they hired a new coach. Stanojlović was then appointed a new coach of Extension Gunners.

On September 19, 2016, he was appointed main coach of Sankoyo Bush Bucks playing in the Botswana Premier League.

References

External links
  at dnevnik.rs
  at Mmegi online

1956 births
Living people
Serbian footballers
FK Partizan players
Yugoslav football managers
Serbian football managers
Yugoslav footballers
Association footballers not categorized by position